Bahre is a river of Saxony, Germany. It is a tributary of the Elbe through the Seidewitz and the Gottleuba. Its source is in the eastern Ore Mountains. It gave its name to the municipality Bahretal.

See also
List of rivers of Saxony

Rivers of Saxony
Rivers of Germany